Blessed Be Your Name: The Hits is Tree63's greatest hits album. It was released in 2008 on Inpop Records.

Track listing

References

2008 greatest hits albums
Tree63 albums